The following is a list of Group CN sports cars that have competed in races in the past.

Groupcn